The Poznań metropolitan area (known in Polish as: Metropolia Poznań) is the metropolitan area of Poznań. The metropolitan area covers ten counties in the Greater Poland Voivodeship, with an area of 2,162 km2

The largest cities or towns within the metropolitan area are Poznań, Swarzędz, Luboń and Mosina.

Economy 
In 2020 Poznań's gross metropolitan product was €26 billion. This puts Poznań in 94th place among cities in European Union.

See also 
 Metropolitan areas in Poland

References 

Metropolitan areas of Poland